The Dean Forest Railway is a  long heritage railway that runs between Lydney and Parkend in the Forest of Dean, Gloucestershire.

The route was part of the former Severn and Wye Railway which ran from Lydney to Cinderford. The society that operates the line started steam locomotive operations in 1971, and bought the trackbed and line from British Rail in 1986, reaching Lydney Junction in 1995 and Parkend in 2005. Trains are operated by both steam and heritage diesel locomotives, and heritage diesel multiple units.

The Dean Forest Railway has been given the former Griffithstown Station building.  Its removal was completed in June 2016, and is expected to be placed at the new upcoming Speech House Road.

CrossCountry are now providing a combined fare for travel to Lydney mainline station (on CrossCountry services only) and then onto the Dean Forest Railway.

In 2016, DFR's director of civil engineering and director of development Jason Shirley announced plans to expand the railway to Cinderford. The project's status as a strategic regional development means that a large proportion of the estimated £8million cost could be met by Government funding.

Stations and Junctions of the DFR 

 Closed

Lydney Junction (Terminus)
St Mary's Halt (now closed, yet still in place).
Lydney Town
Middle Forge Junction – Line splits into High and Low Levels. No Station.
Norchard Low Level (Terminus) - includes a railway museum and shop
Norchard High Level - ramp and steps from Norchard Low Level
Tufts Junction – Historic junction with disused mineral loop and freight branch. No Station.
Whitecroft 
Parkend (Current Terminus)

Proposed future extension 
Coleford Junction Halt
Bicslade Wharf
Speech House Road
Cinderford

Locomotives

Steam

Diesel and electric

Former Steam Locomotives

Visiting Steam Locomotives

Former Diesel Locomotives

Visiting Diesel Locomotives and Multiple units

For the 2001 diesel gala a number of diesel were display at Lydney Junction. These were
37029,37308,37906, D172, 47306, 56111, 60081, 66250 and 66524.

Coaches
The main running set is a mix of BR Mark 1 and 2 stock. Two Mark 2 carriages were purchased by the DFR Society in 2018 so that the Mark 1s could be overhauled. In early 2020, all the Mark 1 and 2s were transferred ownership from the Forest of Dean Railway limited company to the DFR society, including XP64 number 4729.

Great Western Railway coaching stock

British Railways coaching stock

Ex coaching stock

Coach type codes

 BCK – Brake Composite Corridor
 BSK – Brake Standard Corridor
 BSOT – Brake Standard Open (Micro-Buffet)
 RMB – Restaurant Miniature Buffet
 CK – Composite Corridor
 SK – Standard Corridor
 TK – Standard Corridor
 TSO – Tourist Standard Open
 BG – Brake Gangwayed

Wagons
There are lots different types of wagons at the DFR. Some are used for display and other for engineering works. Many of the wagons can be seen in sidings along the line. Sometime the DFR runs ride on fright trains where passenger can ride on the brakevans.

Brakevans

References

External links 

 Dean Forest Railway Website
 Historical site
 Dean Forest Diesel Association
 Dean Forest Railway Society Website

Heritage railways in Gloucestershire
Forest of Dean
Museums in Gloucestershire
Railway museums in England
Standard gauge railways in England
7 ft gauge railways